The Troy Uncle Sam Trojans were a minor-league professional ice hockey team who competed in the Eastern Hockey League in the 1952-53 season.

Based out of Troy, New York, the Trojans were coached by player-coach Bill Moe, and led by Art Stone, who scored 52 goals and added 55 assists for a league-leading 107 points.  They also featured future Toronto Maple Leafs head coach John Brophy and future New York Rangers and brother of Gordie Howe Vic Howe.

The unique nickname was an amalgamation of Troy native Samuel Wilson's famous moniker "Uncle Sam", and "Trojans", the demonym for residents of Troy.   

They finished 23-34-3, last in the five-team league, and folded at the end of the season.

References

Defunct ice hockey teams in the United States
Eastern Hockey League teams
Troy, New York
Sports in Rensselaer County, New York